The Texas Thunder were a professional indoor football team that played in the American Professional Football League in 2004. The Thunder tied the Missouri Minutemen 42-42 in their inaugural APFL game.

The Thunder coaches were James Sanders, Chris Chandler and Art Tarango.  Players of note were:

Matt Holem (AF2)
Hallart Keaton (NIFL) 
Rolf Shaefer (NIFL)
Mark Ricker (NIFL)
Darrell Wilkins (IFL) 
Joshua Sooter (IFL)
Fred Robinson (IPFL)

External links
 Texas Thunder pre-game introductions via YouTube
 Texas Thunder at Indoor Football Hall of Fame and Museum

References

National Indoor Football League teams
American football teams in Texas